Scott Lycett (born 26 September 1992) is an Australian rules footballer playing for the  Port Adelaide Football Club  in the Australian Football League (AFL).

Early career
Lycett played junior football for the Thevenard Magpies, playing one season in the team's senior side at the age of 15 before moving to Adelaide to play for Port Adelaide in the South Australian National Football League (SANFL). He played six matches in Port Adelaide's reserve side and eight games in the team's under-18 side, kicking 18 goals, before making his senior SANFL debut in round 3 of the 2010 season, against West Adelaide. Overall, he played six senior matches for Port Adelaide in 2010. Lycett played both under-16 and under-18 football for South Australia, playing five games at the AFL Under 18 Championships, recording 87 hit-outs.

AFL career
Lycett was taken by the West Coast Eagles in the second round of the 2010 National Draft with pick #29. He was originally expected to be taken with pick #16 by Port Adelaide, but was overlooked by the club.

Lycett made his pre-season debut for the club in round one of the 2011 NAB Cup against .

He was assigned to Peel Thunder in the West Australian Football League (WAFL), making his debut in round 3 of the 2011 season against Claremont. He played 15 consecutive games from round 3 to round 18, kicking 12 goals.

Lycett made his debut for the West Coast Eagles in round 19, 2011, after both Josh Kennedy and Nic Naitanui withdrew due to injury. He kicked two goals on debut, including a goal with his first kick. 

After playing in West Coast's 2018 premiership triumph, Lycett moved to Port Adelaide under the AFL's free agency rules.

During round 3 of the 2019 AFL season,  Scott Lycett was charged with rough conduct. This was resulting in a $3000(AUD) fine.

Statistics
Statistics are correct to the end of round 18 2019

|- style="background-color: #EAEAEA"
! scope="row" style="text-align:center" | 2011
|
| 29 || 1 || 2 || 0 || 4 || 7 || 11 || 2 || 1 || 3 || 2.0 || 0.0 || 4.0 || 7.0 || 11.0 || 2.0 || 1.0 || 3.0
|- 
! scope="row" style="text-align:center" | 2012
|
| 29 || 2 || 1 || 1 || 5 || 7 || 12 || 4 || 2 || 6 || 0.5 || 0.5 || 2.5 || 3.5 || 6.0 || 2.0 || 1.0 || 3.0
|- style="background-color: #EAEAEA"
! scope="row" style="text-align:center" | 2013
|
| 29 || 7 || 2 || 2 || 32 || 44 || 76 || 25 || 15 || 81 || 0.3 || 0.3 || 4.6 || 6.3 || 10.9 || 3.6 || 2.1 || 11.6
|- 
! scope="row" style="text-align:center" | 2014
|
| 29 || 12 || 13 || 5 || 68 || 76 || 144 || 46 || 33 || 164 || 1.1 || 0.4 || 5.7 || 6.3 || 12.0 || 3.8 || 2.8 || 13.7
|- style="background-color: #EAEAEA"
! scope="row" style="text-align:center" | 2015
|
| 29 || 6 || 3 || 2 || 35 || 32 || 67 || 18 || 20 || 98 || 0.5 || 0.3 || 5.8 || 5.3 || 11.2 || 3.0 || 3.3 || 16.3
|- 
! scope="row" style="text-align:center" | 2016
|
| 29 || 21 || 14 || 8 || 133 || 125 || 258 || 70 || 90 || 396 || 0.7 || 0.4 || 6.3 || 6.0 || 12.3 || 3.3 || 4.3 || 18.9
|- style="background-color: #EAEAEA"
! scope="row" style="text-align:center" | 2017
|
| 29 || 1 || 0 || 0 || 6 || 6 || 12 || 3 || 0 || 18 || 0.0 || 0.0 || 6.0 || 6.0 || 12.0 || 3.0 || 0.0 || 18.0
|- 
|style="text-align:center;background:#afe6ba;"|2018†
|
| 29 || 25 || 10 || 10 || 167 || 145 || 312 || 69 || 83 || 502 || 0.4 || 0.4 || 6.7 || 5.8 || 12.5 || 2.8 || 3.3 || 20.1
|- style="background-color: #EAEAEA"
! scope="row" style="text-align:center" | 2019
|
| 29 || 16 || 6 || 4 || 121 || 125 || 244 || 47 || 48 || 421 || 0.6 || 0.3 || 6.4 || 8.1 || 14.6 || 2.6 || 3.1 || 17.4
|- class="sortbottom"
! colspan=3| Career
! 91
! 51
! 32
! 569
! 567
! 1124
! 284
! 292
! 1687
! 0.6
! 0.4
! 6.0
! 6.1
! 12.1
! 3.1
! 3.1
! 17.4
|}

References

External links

1992 births
Australian rules footballers from South Australia
Peel Thunder Football Club players
Port Adelaide Magpies players
West Coast Eagles players
West Coast Eagles Premiership players
Living people
Port Adelaide Football Club players
One-time VFL/AFL Premiership players